Tania Long (April 29, 1913 – September 4, 1998) was an American journalist and war correspondent during World War II.

Biography

Early life 
Tania Long was the only child of Irish journalist Robert Edward Crozier Long and his Russian wife, Tatiana Mouravieff. 

After several years of living in Scandinavian capitals and attending the Lorenz Lyceum in Berlin from 1920 to 1924, young Tania studied at the Ecole des Jeunes Filles at Saint-Germain-en-Laye, near Paris, until 1927. 

From then until 1930, she was a student at the Malvern Girls' College in England. In her post-graduate work at the Sorbonne in Paris (1930–31), and at the Paris Ecole des Sciences Politiques, she specialized in history and economics. She received her first journalistic training by observing and assisting her father.

Early career 
While studying in Paris, Tania met and fell in love with an American, Merwin Mallory Gray, and after their marriage in Paris in 1932, they moved to New York City, where their son, Robert Merwin Gray, was born the following year. Around 1935, Tania became an American citizen, and launched her journalistic career the following year when she began working as a reporter for the Newark Ledger.

Berlin 
Tania decided to stay in Berlin worked for the New York Herald Tribune.

She noticed that people were disappearing from her apartment building. After about ten days, she left for Denmark. Tania spent two weeks in Copenhagen taking down by hand the news copy from the Polish front sent by Joseph Barnes, Herald Tribune correspondent, who had no other way of getting his copy to New York. Then she was ordered to Paris where she was told she would be permanently assigned.

London 
However, in late September 1939, Tania was transferred to London where a shortage of staff had developed due to the illness of the bureau chief, Ralph Barnes. It was supposed to be a temporary position but became permanent. By early 1940, it became evident that Hitler would invade the Low Countries and France, and Tania got her family out of France to Ireland, safe from possible bombing attacks. At that time, all American civilians were ordered out of the European war zone by the United States government which then sent three ships to Ireland to pick them up, taking Tania's son and mother to the United States.

Soon after arriving in London in late 1939, Tania, by then divorced, met her future husband, Raymond Daniell, London correspondent for The New York Times. Before meeting Tania, Ray "had considered newspaper work in London, a man's job"; but, he wrote later, she "provided us with as much competition as any man in London."

In September 1940, Tania covered the bombing of London among other things.

In February 1941, an article appeared in the New York Herald-Tribune: "The 19th annual Front Page Ball of the New York Newspaper Women's Club was held last night [at] the Waldorf-Astoria Hotel. Mrs. Franklin D. Roosevelt, a wife of the President, was the special guest of honor. The highlight of the evening was the presentation of two awards [...] by Mrs. Roosevelt for outstanding work by New York City newspaper women during 1940. The prize winners in the contest sponsored by the club were Miss Tania Long, war correspondent of the New York Herald-Tribune, and Miss Kay Thomas [...] of The New York Sun."

In November 1941, Ray Daniell published his book, Civilians Must Fight. "Before Pearl Harbor, his calm dispassionate book [...] pointed out to Americans that their only choice lay between fighting Nazism and accepting the terms of "a Hitler astride three-quarters of the world.""

On November 22, 1941, Tatiana Long and Raymond Daniell married in London.

Now married to a member of her employer's opposition, Tania left the Herald Tribune and joined The New York Times in February 1942. Remaining based in London for the duration of World War II, Ray and Tania, despite the dangers of crossing the Atlantic, managed to return twice to their home in Westport, Connecticut, where they had two months vacation. Here, Tania was reunited with her son and mother.

Europe 
In 1944, Tania was asked to do a job for the Office of Strategic Services (forerunner of the CIA) and was assigned to the headquarters of the First Army in Spa, Belgium, which was already occupied by US forces.

As war correspondents for The New York Times, Tania and Ray followed the Allied forces into Berlin in 1945. Ray arrived there the day the Allies entered Berlin, and Tania followed the day after.

During World Wars I and II, Tania and her parents's possessions, including the Long Family papers and photos, had been stored in a downtown Berlin warehouse. Though the warehouse had been bombed, everything they owned was intact. With the termination of the war, Tania remained in Germany and assisted her husband in The New York Times coverage of the Nuremberg Trials. Then "Miss Long turned her attention to conditions in conquered Germany. Her articles in the New York Times Magazine, and her news stories, attracted considerable comment for the picture she presented of the dangerous effect of fraternization by American troops in Germany on the American occupation policy."

Secretary of War Robert P. Patterson honored war correspondents, including Long, at an event in Washington, on November 23, 1946.

Post-war Britain 
During 1946, rumors circulated that a royal wedding was possible. Despite denials from the palace, The New York Times went front page on December 16: "Raymond Daniell reported from London that 'only politics, which has blighted so many royal romances, is delaying the announcement of the engagement of Princess Elizabeth, heiress to the British throne, and Prince Philip of Greece." Tania, as London correspondent of The New York Times, attended the wedding of Princess Elizabeth and Philip Mountbatten on November 20, 1947, and on June 2, 1953, Tania Long and Ray Daniell carried out their final assignment as London correspondents of The New York Times, with Ray writing the main story of the coronation of Queen Elizabeth II while Tania covered the coronation ceremony in Westminster Abbey.

Canada 
That same year, Ray and Tania were transferred to The Times''' Canadian bureau in Ottawa.

 New York 
When Ray was assigned to the United Nations in 1964, the Daniells moved to New York City, thus enabling Tania to pay frequent visits to her mother in Westport, Connecticut. In 1967, Tania and Ray returned to Ottawa, Ontario, Canada. "Ottawa became his home by chance. Assigned here by the mighty New York Times in the early 1950s, he stayed on for 12 years before accepting an appointment to the paper's United Nations staff." And when it came time to retire, Ray and Tania returned to a city where they had many friends and where they had spent many years. Comfortably settled into their new home, Ray and Tania were to enjoy only two years of retirement together when Ray fell ill and died on April 12, 1969, at the age of sixty-seven. Comforted by the presence of her mother who had come to live with them in Ottawa, Tania found the strength to carry on.

 Ottawa 
In late 1969, Tania began her second career (which lasted for ten years), as the publicist for the Music Department of the National Arts Centre in Ottawa.

Tania's mother, had come a long way from Tambov, Russia. She had come to Canada via Berlin, Brittany and Connecticut and, just a few days short of her 94th birthday, fell ill with pneumonia and died on March 29, 1978. Tania suffered personal tragedy again in 1981 when her son Robert Gray died at the age of forty-six. Although he had been married, he had no children.

For several years she made annual visits to New York and Paris, home of her Aunt Vera and cousin Tatiana. And having visited Wisconsin in the late 1980s, she had occasion to meet several of her Long cousins, one (Theron D. Long) of whom she said resembled her father.

Tania died on September 4, 1998.

 Personal life 
A long-time resident of Ottawa, Ontario, Canada, Tania Long was an activist who believed strongly in participatory democracy. Tania organized petitions designed to improve the quality of life in her neighborhood. Brought up in the classical tradition of Europe, Tania enjoyed attending the opera, ballet, and symphony concerts; her hobbies included reading, swimming and gardening.

 References 

 Obituary – NY Times

 Sources 
 Article based on section of The Longs of Longfield'', privately published in Toronto in 1998 by Dale Martin Caragata.

External links 
 

American women journalists
The New York Times writers
1913 births
1998 deaths
People educated at Malvern St James
20th-century American non-fiction writers
20th-century American women writers
American war correspondents of World War II
Naturalized citizens of the United States
New York Herald Tribune people
The New York Times people